Danny Siegel is an American author, lecturer, and poet who has spoken in more than 500 North American communities, to communal organizations, synagogues, JCC's, Federations, on Tzedakah and Jewish values. "Tzedakah" is loosely translated as 'charity' or 'charitable giving', though a better translation is 'righteous giving.'

Siegel is often referred to as "The World's Greatest Expert on Microphilanthropy", "The Feeling Person's Thinker", and "The Pied Piper of Tzedakah", and most recently as "A Pioneer Of Tzedakah" by the New York Jewish Week editor and publisher, Gary Rosenblatt.

Biography

Siegel founded the Ziv Tzedakah Fund in 1981 after making several trips to Israel carrying money to be distributed to those in need. Jewish tradition teaches that anyone on a mission of good deeds will be saved from harm, and so, on each trip, Siegel followed this age-old custom and asked friends and relatives for a dollar or two to give away to Tzedakah upon his arrival in the Holy Land.

Once in Israel, Siegel went in search of "the Good People" (he refers to them as "Mitzvah Heroes"), ordinary Israelis who were doing extraordinary work, by simply in trying to make the world a better place. Within a short time, he learned of the efforts of such people as Hadassah Levi, who made her life's work the rescue of abandoned babies with Down syndrome from hospitals, Myriam Mendilow, who found Jerusalem's poor, elderly residents on the streets of the city and gave them respect and new purpose in her program, Yad L'Kashish (Lifeline for the Old), or Uri Lupolianski, a young teacher who started Israel's now famous lending program, Yad Sarah, in his living room.

He has found these "Mitzvah heroes" in countless places around the world. And his challenge to everyone is that he "wants to turn ordinary people into superheroes".

Siegel works with over 100 such altruists around the world. He "has a stable of everyday, real-life Mitzvah heroes, young and old, with projects ranging from the ordinary to the unusual".

After returning from his first trip, Siegel issued a four-page report to all of his donors in which he described all of the places that he had distributed their Tzedakah money. From that first $955 Siegel collected and gave away, Ziv has grown to an organization that in 2007 completed its 32nd year of operation and has distributed more than $14,000,000 primarily to small programs and projects in both Israel and the United States. (In 2006, over $2,000,000 was given away to people in need; and the same for 2007-8). Siegel has decided to retire from the active running of Ziv Tzedakah Fund, and Ziv has closed its doors as of December 2008. Siegel influenced thousands of people with his unique tzedakah and mitzvah philosophy. With the closing of Ziv Tzedakah Fund in 2008, Siegel identified several other organizations in his final report to donors. All of these groups operate in a similar manner as Ziv and they include Hands on Tzedakah, the Mitzvah Heroes Fund, started by Siegel's students (Steve Kerbel, Bill Begal, and Mary Meyerson) and continues Siegel's long-standing tradition of employing someone in Israel, on the ground choosing Arnie Draiman as the Director for Israel Projects Draiman worked for Siegel  for over 15 years and continues to work closely with him today);  KAVOD, Tzedakah Fund, Inc., To Save A Life Foundation and The Good People Fund.  
His approach to Tzedakah "offers a no frills, no red tape way to help those in need", according to the San Diego Jewish Journal.

Siegel has a B.S. in Comparative Literature from Columbia University's School of General Studies, and a Bachelor's and Master's of Hebrew Literature from the Jewish Theological Seminary of America.

He is one of three recipients of the prestigious 1993 Covenant Award for Exceptional Jewish Educators.

Literary career

Siegel is the author of 29 books on such topics as practical and personalized giving, healing and humor, and has produced an anthology of 500 selections of Biblical and Talmudic quotes about living life called Where Heaven and Earth Touch.  Siegel is also a poet and several of his published books are poetry.

In 2020, the Jewish Publication Society published an anthology of Siegel's writings, '''''Radiance: Creative Mitzvah Living, The Selected Prose and Poetry of Danny Siegel, edited by Rabbi Neal Gold and with a foreword by Rabbi Joseph Telushkin.

Published works

Tzedakah, Mitzvahs, Tikkun Olam, and Jewish Values
 Angels, 1980
 Gym Shoes and Irises: Personalized Tzedakah, 1981
 Gym Shoes and Irises: Book Two, 1987, 
 Munbaz II and Other Mitzvah Heroes, 1988, 
 Family Reunion: Making Peace in the Jewish Community, 1989, 
 Mitzvahs, 1990, 
 After the Rain, 1993, 
 Good People, 1995, 
 Heroes and Miracle Workers 1997, 
 1 + 1 = 3 and 37 Other Mitzvah Principles For a Meaningful Life 2000, 
 Danny Siegel’s Bar and Bat Mitzvah Mitzvah Book: A Practical Guide For Changing the World Through Your Simcha, 2004, 
 Who, Me? Yes, You! — Danny Siegel’s Workbook to Help You Decide Where, When, Why, and How You Can Do Your Best Tikkun Olam, 2006, 
 Giving Your Money Away, How Much, How to, Where, and To Whom, 2006,

For Children
 The Humongous Pushka in the Sky, 1993, 
 Tell Me a Mitzvah (Children’s stories, Kar‑Ben Copies, Inc.), 1993, 
 Mitzvah Magic: What Kids Can Do to Change the World (Kar‑Ben/Lerner), 2002,

Midrash and Halachah
 Where Heaven and Earth Touch: An Anthology of Midrash and Halachah; Book One, 1983; Large Print Edition, 1985, Book Two, 1984, Book Three, 1985
 Where Heaven and Earth Touch: Combined Books One‑Three, 1988, 
 Where Heaven and Earth Touch: Hardback edition, 1989; Soft cover, 1995 (Jason Aronson publishers), 
 Source Book: Selected Hebrew and Aramaic Sources, 1985

Poetry
 From the Heart, 2012
 Soulstoned, 1969
 And God Braided Eveʹs Hair, 1976
 Between Dust and Dance (with prose), 1978
 Nine Entered Paradise Alive, 1980
 Unlocked Doors: The Selected Poems of Danny Siegel 1969‑1983, 1983
 The Lord Is A Whisper at Midnight: Psalms and Prayers, 1985
 The Garden, Where Wolves and Lions Do No Harm to the Sheep and Deer, 1985
 Before Our Very Eyes: Readings for a Journey Through Israel, 1986
 The Meadow Beyond the Meadow, 1991, 
 Hearing Heart, 1992,

Healing
 Healing: Readings and Meditations, 1999,

Humor
 The Unorthodox Book of Jewish Records and Lists (co‑authored with Allan Gould), 1982,

References

Further reading

External links
Official web site
To Save a Life
Kavod
Mitzvah Heroes Fund
The Good People Fund
Arnie Draiman

Living people
American Jews
American humanitarians
American philanthropists
Year of birth missing (living people)